Yıldız Çağrı Atiksoy (born 1 April 1986) is a Turkish actress best known for her role as Malhun Hatun in the Turkish historical TV series Kuruluş: Osman.

Career
She studied theatre for two years at the İzmir Ege Art Center and continued her education at the Müjdat Gezen Art Center. She also got lessons in cinema, technique and acting at Plato Film. Atiksoy started her career in 2004 with a small role in the Büyük Buluşma TV series. She played in fantasy child series "Kayıp Prenses".

Her breakthrough came in 2011 with Öyle Bir Geçer Zaman ki, in which she portrayed the character of Berrin Akarsu. Between 2014-15, she starred in the series Yedi Güzel Adam as Zehra. She played in romantic comedy "Evli ve Öfkeli". In 2017, she joined the cast of Savaşçı and played the role of Aslı Özkaynak until 2018. The following year she began starring in the TRT 1 series Şampiyon. In 2021, she joined the historical TV series Kuruluş: Osman in the role of Malhun Hatun.She also won Golden Palm Awards 2021 in the category of Best TV Series  Actress for her performance as Malhun Hatun.

Filmography

References

External links 
 
 

1986 births
Turkish film actresses
Turkish television actresses
Actresses from Istanbul
Living people